Nathan "Carnage" Corbett (born 23 October 1979) is a retired Australian Muay Thai kickboxer, color commentator for Lion Fight Promotions on CBS Sports and feature author at Fightmag. He is a former 11-time Muay Thai World Champion, and is one of the most decorated heavyweights in the history of Muay Thai.

Hailing out of the Urban Fight Gym, Gold Coast Corbett was the World Muaythai Council (WMC) Cruiserweight World champion, the K-1 Scandinavia 2007 tournament champion, the World Boxing Council Muaythai (WBC Muaythai) Cruiserweight World Champion and former World Kickboxing Network (WKN) Heavyweight Muay Thai Champion (including three defenses).

Biography and career
Nathan Corbett started practicing martial arts with karate at the age of 14, which then led him to shoot boxing and Muay Thai.

Corbett turned professional in 1997 and rose to national prominence in 2002 when he defeated Australian legend Scott 'The Cannon' Bannon with a slicing right elbow. He then followed up this strong performance with a 1st-round KO win over Clifton Brown of Canada, winning his first WMC World Title.

On 26 June 2005 at Xplosion 10 event in Australia, Corbett won his second WMC World Title over Russian fighter Magomed Magomedov.

At 3rd MARS World Fighting GP in Chiba, Japan in 2006 he suffered his first KO loss of his career against American Heavyweight Alex Roberts.

Corbett vs. Spong I

Corbett’s career is undoubtedly tied to that of Tyrone Spong. The two fought for the first time in Jamaica in 2009 in a highly anticipated bout of heavyweight kick boxers at the peak of their respected careers. It would be a major test for Corbett as Spong was the not only the most decorated fighter he would challenge at that point but the bout would be under modified kickboxing rules, eliminating Corbett's ability to use his infamous elbows.

In what was considered a controversial bout Corbett knocked Spong out in the third round. Spong, to his credit, managed to rise back to his feet, however referee Paolo Tocha stopped the fight as Spong was visibly staggering. As the signal was given to stop the fight, Corbett misinterpreted this as a restart and began to strike Spong further. This led to Paolo Tocha stopping the fight altogether and ruling the bout a no contest.

He was scheduled to face Nikolaj Falin at Kings of Kombat 8 in Melbourne on 8 December 2012 but his opponent pulled out due to health issues.

He was then reported to be fighting Dzianis Hancharonak at Total Carnage III in Gold Coast on 9 March 2013 but Hancharonak was already penciled in to face another opponent close to that date and did not accept the fight, and so Javlon Nazarov stepped in. Finally, Nazarov was replaced by Kamil Sokolowski of Poland Sokolowski began the contest with heavy pressure but was countered viciously with knees and finally a right elbow to the temple of Sokolowski handing Corbett a KO victory 20 seconds into the first round.

Corbett vs. Spong II

He signed a two-fight contract with Glory in July 2013. In his long-awaited rematch with Tyrone Spong at Glory 11: Chicago - Heavyweight World Championship Tournament in Hoffman Estates, Illinois, United States on 12 October 2013, he was dropped twice with left hooks in round two and lost by TKO.

At Total Carnage IV held in Gold Coast on 14 December 2013, Nathan Corbett took a second round elbow TKO win over Henriques Zowa, defending the WKN Heavyweight Muay Thai World Title.

Corbett vs. Saki

Competing for the inaugural Glory Light Heavyweight Championship, he fought in the Glory 15: Istanbul - Light Heavyweight World Championship Tournament in Istanbul, Turkey on 12 April 2014. In the semi-finals against Gökhan Saki, Corbett was struck with a left overhand to the ear, or what's infamously referred to as the "Saki Bomb". Corbett's ear exploded, which led to part of the ear openly hanging off. The ringside physician intervened and referee Al Wichgers called a halt to the fight at the 2:35 of Round 1, handing Corbett a TKO loss and eliminating him from the tournament.

In a twisted turn of events, Saki would go on to face Tyrone Spong in the finals. 1:30 into Round 1 Spong attempted a right low kick from the southpaw stance. Saki, standing orthodox, checked the kick, resulting in Spongs leg breaking. Spong then stepped back onto the broken leg before falling to the canvas. The referee immediately stopped the bout.

Personal life

Nathan Corbett currently lives in California, USA. He continues to train and teach Muay Thai.

Corbett actively travels, co-leading the Ronin-Carnage Team alongside Misa Ronin in Novi Sad, Serbia.

Corbett is a regular contributor to FIGHTMAG, where he writes the 'Carnage Diary'.

In 2017 Corbett launched the 'Ultimate Warrior Retreat' in Bali, Indonesia. Described as 6 days of training the body and mind through the art of yoga and Muay Thai, as well as mentoring talks and cultural beauty.

Titles

Over the course of 10 years, Corbett collected 11 prestigious World title belts.

 2013 W.K.N. Muay Thai Heavyweight World Champion
 2013 W.K.N. Muay Thai Heavyweight World Champion
 2012 W.K.N. Muay Thai Heavyweight World Champion
 2010 W.K.N. Muay Thai Heavyweight World Champion
 2010 A-1 World Combat Cup Heavyweight Tournament Champion
 2009 W.I.P.U. King of the Ring Champion
 2007 K-1 Fighting Network Scandinavian Qualification Champion
 2005 W.B.C. Muay Thai Light Heavyweight World Champion
 2005–06 W.M.C. Muay Thai Cruiserweight World Champion
 2005 I.M.F. World Champion
 2003 W.M.C. Muay Thai Light Heavyweight World Champion.

Kickboxing record

|-  style="background:#fbb;"
| 2014-04-12 || Loss ||align=left| Gökhan Saki || Glory 15: Istanbul – Light Heavyweight World Championship Tournament, Semi Finals || Istanbul, Turkey || TKO (Ear injury) || 1 || 2:35 || 59–5–1
|-  style="background:#cfc;"
| 2013-12-14 || Win ||align=left| Henriques Zowa || Total Carnage IV || Gold Coast, Australia || TKO (Left elbow) || 2 || 1:47 || 59–4–1
|-
! style=background:white colspan=9 |
|-  style="background:#fbb;"
| 2013-10-12 || Loss ||align=left| Tyrone Spong || Glory 11: Chicago || Hoffman Estates, Illinois, USA || TKO (Left hook) || 2 || 1:10 || 58–4–1
|-  style="background:#cfc;"
| 2013-03-09 || Win ||align=left| Kamil Sokolowski || Total Carnage III || Gold Coast, Australia || KO (Right elbow) || 1 || 0.20 || 58–3–1
|-
! style=background:white colspan=9 |
|-  style="background:#cfc;"
| 2012-09-01 || Win ||align=left| Steve McKinnon || Total Carnage II || Gold Coast, Australia ||Decision (Unanimous) ||5 ||3:00 || 57–3–1
|-  style="background:#cfc;"
| 2012-06-23 || Win ||align=left| Adrian Marc || Kings of Kombat 7 || Melbourne, Australia ||TKO (Low kick) ||1 || || 56–3–1
|-
|-  style="background:#cfc;"
| 2012-04-07 || Win ||align=left| Stéphane Susperregui ||Fight Night Total Carnage|| Gold Coast, Australia || Decision || 5|| 3:00 || 55–3–1
|-
! style=background:white colspan=9 |
|-  style="background:#cfc;"
| 2011-11-06 || Win ||align=left| Abdarhmane Coulibaly || Muaythai Premier League: Round 3 || The Hague, Netherlands || Decision (Unanimous) || 3 || 3:00 || 54–3–1
|-  style="background:#cfc;"
| 2011-09-02 || Win ||align=left| Tomáš Hron || Muaythai Premier League: Round 1 || Long Beach, CA, United States || KO (Punches) || 1 || 2:38 || 53–3–1
|-  style="background:#cfc;"
| 2011-04-16 || Win ||align=left| Piotr Lepich || Domination 6 || Mirrabooka, Australia || KO (Elbow) || 1 || 2:59 || 52–3–1
|-  style="background:#cfc;"
| 2010-11-27 || Win ||align=left| Frank Muñoz || Evolution 22 || Gold Coast, Australia || TKO (Referee stoppage) || 3 || || 51–3–1
|-  style="background:#cfc;"
| 2010-09-19 || Win ||align=left| Pavel Zhuravlev || Domination 5 || Perth, Australia || KO (Knee strike) || 4 || 1:19 || 50–3–1
|-
! style=background:white colspan=9 |
|-  style="background:#cfc;"
| 2010-06-09 || Win ||align=left| Cedric Kongaika || Last Man Standing 2, final || Melbourne, Australia ||Decision (Unanimous) || 3 ||3:00 || 49–3–1
|-
! style=background:white colspan=9 |
|-  style="background:#cfc;"
| 2010-06-09 || Win ||align=left| Thor Hoopman || Last Man Standing 2, semi final || Melbourne, Australia || Decision (Unanimous) || 3 || 3:00 || 48–3–1
|-  style="background:#cfc;"
| 2010-06-09 || Win ||align=left| Shane Tilyard || Last Man Standing 2, quarter final || Melbourne, Australia || TKO (Referee stoppage) || 2 || 1:32 || 47–3–1
|-  style="background:#cfc;"
| 2009-08-08 ||Win ||align=left| Michael Andrade || Xplosion Super Fight 19 || Gold Coast, Australia || TKO (Referee stoppage) ||2 || 2:52 || 46–3–1
|-  style="background:#c5d2ea;"
| 2009-06-26 || NC ||align=left| Tyrone Spong || Champions of Champions 2 || Montego Bay, Jamaica || NC (Original KO for Corbett) || 3 || || 45–3–1
|-  style="background:#cfc;"
| 2009-05-29 || Win ||align=left| Sinisa Andrijasevic || Brute Force 11 || Melbourne, Australia || KO (Knee strike) || 1 || || 45–3
|-
! style=background:white colspan=9 |
|-  style="background:#cfc;"
| 2009-04-04 || Win ||align=left| Emmanuelle Payet || Evolution 16 || Brisbane, Australia || TKO (Leg kick) || 2 || || 44–3
|-  style="background:#cfc;"
| 2008-12-06 || Win ||align=left| Tony Angelov || Evolution 15 "The Contender Qualifier" || Brisbane, Australia || KO (Left hook) || 2 || 1:41 || 43–3
|-  style="background:#cfc;"
| 2008-09-04 || Win ||align=left| Wehaj KingBoxing || Evolution 14 "The Contenders" || Brisbane, Australia || KO (Elbow strike) || 2 || || 42–3
|-  style="background:#cfc;"
| 2008-04-26 || Win ||align=left| Leonard Sitpholek || Evolution 13 "Carnival of Carnage" || Brisbane, Australia || TKO (Doctor stoppage) || 3 || || 41–3
|-  style="background:#cfc;"
| 2008-03-29 || Win ||align=left| Mike Sbrzesny || Xplosion 18 Super Fights || Sydney, Australia || TKO (Doctor stoppage) || 1 || || 40–3
|-  style="background:#cfc;"
| 2007-12-08 || Win ||align=left| Recai Celik || Xplosion 17 || Sydney, Australia || KO (Punches) || 1 || 2:59 || 39–3
|-
! style=background:white colspan=9 |
|-  style="background:#cfc;"
| 2007-09-01 || Win ||align=left| Erik Kosztanko || Evolution 11 "Night of Carnage" || Brisbane, Australia || KO || 3 || 2:01 || 38–3
|-  style="background:#cfc;"
| 2007-06-22 || Win ||align=left| Kaoklai Kaennorsing || Xplosion Super Fights || Gold Coast, Australia || KO (Punches) || 2 || 2:48 || 37–3
|-  style="background:#cfc;"
| 2007-05-19 || Win ||align=left| Ashwin Balrak || K-1 Scandinavia GP 2007 || Stockholm, Sweden || Decision (Unanimous) || 3 || 3:00 || 36–3
|-
! style=background:white colspan=9 |
|-  style="background:#cfc;"
| 2007-05-19 || Win ||align=left| Teodor Sariyev || K-1 Scandinavia GP 2007 || Stockholm, Sweden || Decision (Unanimous) || 3 || 3:00 || 35–3
|-  style="background:#cfc;"
| 2007-05-19 || Win ||align=left| Azem Maksutaj || K-1 Scandinavia GP 2007 || Stockholm, Sweden || TKO || 2 || 2:40 || 34–3
|-  style="background:#cfc;"
| 2006-11-11 || Win ||align=left| Clifton Brown || Xplosion Macau || Macau, China || KO (Uppercut) || 2 || || 33–3
|-
! style=background:white colspan=9 |
|-  style="background:#cfc;"
| 2006-08-18 || Win ||align=left| Steve McKinnon || Xplosion 13 || Sydney, Australia || TKO (Doctor stoppage) || 4 || || 32–3
|-  style="background:#fbb;"
| 2006-05-15 || Loss ||align=left| Alex Roberts || 3rd MARS World Fighting GP || Chiba, Japan || KO (Right high kick) || 2 || 1:57 || 31–3
|-  style="background:#cfc;"
| 2005-12-10 || Win ||align=left| Magnum Sakai || Xplosion 12 WBC Muay Thai Event || Gold Coast, Australia || TKO (Elbow strikes) || 3 || || 31–2
|-
! style=background:white colspan=9 |
|-  style="background:#cfc;"
| 2005-09-09 || Win ||align=left| Kwak-Yun Sub || Xplosion 2005 Hong Kong || Hong Kong || KO (Elbow strike) || 1 || || 30–2
|-
! style=background:white colspan=9 |
|-  style="background:#fbb;"
| 2005-08-28 || Loss ||align=left| Noboru Uchida || Titans 2nd || Japan || DQ (Kicked downed opponent) || 1 || || 29–2
|-  style="background:#cfc;"
| 2005-06-25 || Win ||align=left| Magomed Magomedov || K-1 Challenge 2005 Xplosion X || Sydney, Australia || Decision (Unanimous) || 5 || 3:00 || 29–1
|-
! style=background:white colspan=9 |
|-  style="background:#cfc;"
| 2005-04-15 || Win ||align=left| Kiattisak Hemkajit || Xplosion 9 || Sydney, Australia || TKO || 2 || || 28–1
|-  style="background:#cfc;"
| 2004-12-18 || Win ||align=left| Tatsufumi Tomihira || K-1 Challenge 2004 Oceania vs World || Gold Coast, Australia || Decision (Unanimous) || 3 || 3:00 || 27–1
|-  style="background:#cfc;"
| 2004-11-07 || Win ||align=left| Myeon Ju Lee || Titans 1st || Kitakyushu, Japan || TKO (Corner stop./towel) || 3 || 1:25 || 26–1
|-  style="background:#cfc;"
| 2004-09-19 || Win ||align=left| Nilson de Castro || Shoot Boxing World Tournament 2004 || Yokohama, Japan || KO (Left hook) || 2 || 1:52 || 25–1
|-  style="background:#cfc;"
| 2004-08-27 || Win ||align=left| Jean Wanet || Evolution 2 || Brisbane, Australia || KO || 1 || || 24–1
|-  style="background:#cfc;"
| 2004-07-23 || Win ||align=left| Aaron Boyes || Supreme Carnage || Australia || KO || 1 || || 23–1
|-  style="background:#cfc;"
| 2004-06-26 || Win ||align=left| Jayson Vemoa || Boonch Cup Muay Thai Event || Gold Coast, Australia || KO (Knee strike) || 1 || || 22–1
|-  style="background:#cfc;"
| 2004-05-22 || Win ||align=left| Brett Franklin || Samurai Explosion || Sydney, Australia || KO (Left punch) || 1 || || 21–1
|-  style="background:#cfc;"
| 2004-05-16 || Win ||align=left| Magomed Magomedov || WMC World Title in Hong Kong || Hong Kong || Decision (Unanimous) || 5 || 3:00 || 20–1
|-  style="background:#cfc;"
| 2003-12-16 || Win ||align=left| Clifton Brown || Xplosion Super Fight Vol. 5 || Gold Coast, Australia || KO (Overhead elbow) || 1 || 2:54 || 19–1
|-
! style=background:white colspan=9 |
|-  style="background:#cfc;"
| 2003-08-08 || Win ||align=left| Danny Maskacheff || Boonchu Cup Warriors of Muay Thai || Gold Coast, Australia || KO (Left uppercut elbow) || 2 || || 18–1
|-  style="background:#cfc;"
| 2003-06-01 || Win ||align=left| Koji Iga || Shootboxing – S of the World vol.3 || Japan || KO (Punches) || 2 || 0:57 || 17–1
|-  style="background:#cfc;"
| 2003-04-27 || Win ||align=left| Blair Hinds || Xplosion 4 Shootboxing vs Muay Thai 3 || Australia || TKO (Referee stoppage) || 4 || || 16–1
|-  style="background:#cfc;"
| 2002-12-15 || Win ||align=left| Koji Iga || Xplosion 3 – Kings Of Champions || Australia || TKO || 4 || || 15–1
|-  style="background:#cfc;"
| 2002-09-21 || Win ||align=left| Chris Johnson || S-Mac Event || Gold Coast, Australia || TKO (Kicks) || 5 || || 14–1
|-  style="background:#cfc;"
| 2002-07-28 || Win ||align=left| Chad Walker || Muay Thai Uprising Boonchu Cup || Gold Coast, Australia || Decision (Unanimous) || 5 || 3:00 || 13–1
|-  style="background:#cfc;"
| 2002-07-07 || Win ||align=left| Yu Ikeda || Shoot Boxing World Tournament 2002 || Tokyo, Japan || KO (Punches) || 2 || 1:07 || 12–1
|-  style="background:#cfc;"
| 2002-04-18 || Win ||align=left| Scott Bannan || || Brisbane, Australia || TKO (Referee stoppage) || 2 || || 11–1
|-  style="background:#cfc;"
| 2002-03-16 || Win ||align=left| Steve Delyster || Muay Thai Explosion Boonchu Cup || Gold Coast, Australia || || || || 10–1
|-  style="background:#cfc;"
| 2001-07-08 || Win ||align=left| Kelly Witchard || X-plosion On Jupiters! || Gold Coast, Australia || KO || || || 9–1
|-  style="background:#fbb;"
| 2001-05-12 || Loss ||align=left| Paul Slowinski || Light Heavyweight Super 8 || Brisbane, Australia || Decision (Unanimous) || 3 || 3:00 || 8–1
|-  style="background:#cfc;"
| 2001-03-18 || Win ||align=left| Steve Delyster || Boonchu Cup 2 || Gold Coast, Australia || KO (Left body rip) || 3 || || 8–0
|-  style="background:#cfc;"
| 2000-05-20 || Win ||align=left| John Woods || Boonchu Cup 1 || Gold Coast, Australia || KO || 2 || || 7–0
|-  style="background:#cfc;"
| 2000 || Win ||align=left| Stanley Nandex || Jimmy Cass Show || Queensland, Australia || Decision || 5 || 3:00 || 6–0
|-
| colspan=9 | Legend:

See also
List of K-1 champions
List of male kickboxers

References

External links

Australian male kickboxers
Light heavyweight kickboxers
Cruiserweight kickboxers
Heavyweight kickboxers
Australian male karateka
Australian Muay Thai practitioners
1979 births
Living people
Australian expatriate sportspeople in Thailand
Sportspeople from the Gold Coast, Queensland